Iván Balaskó (born 14 September 1979 in Budapest) is a Hungarian football (Midfielder) player who currently plays for CF Liberty Salonta.

External links
Player profile at Nemzeti Sport 
Player profile at HLSZ 

1979 births
Living people
Footballers from Budapest
Hungarian footballers
Hungary under-21 international footballers
Hungary youth international footballers
Association football midfielders
Nemzeti Bajnokság I players
Budapest Honvéd FC players
MTK Budapest FC players
BKV Előre SC footballers
Dunaújváros FC players
FC Sopron players
Pécsi MFC players
Paksi FC players
Rákospalotai EAC footballers
Hungarian expatriate footballers
CF Liberty Oradea players
Expatriate footballers in Romania
21st-century Hungarian people